WFAW (940 AM) is a radio station broadcasting a classic rock format. WFAW previously aired news and talk and oldies music, and for many years featured a country music format. Licensed to Fort Atkinson, Wisconsin, United States, the station serves the Jefferson County and Janesville/Beloit area. The station is owned by Magnum Media, through licensee Magnum Communications, Inc., and features programming from Westwood One.  Along with its sister station WKCH, WFAW is also a major broadcaster of UW-Whitewater Warhawks athletics.

On October 5, 2020, WFAW changed its format from news/talk to oldies, branded as "Oldies 940". In December 2021 WFAW added an FM translator licensed to Janesville on 101.1 FM broadcasting from a tower near Edgerton which also provides rimshot coverage to the Madison area.

On August 22, 2022, WFAW changed its format from oldies to classic rock, dropping the remainder of local sports and the majority of local news programing. The new format branded "Rock 96.1/101.1", is also simulcast on translator W241BQ 96.1 FM Watertown, bringing FM coverage to most of the southern and eastern portions of the Madison market as well as the Janesville-Beloit market. WFAW now competes with fellow rock outlet WWHG in the Janesville/Beloit area as well as Madison and Milwaukee based rock outlets. WFAW also compliments identically branded Portage based rock station WAUN which similarly is paired with two FM translators. WAUN with its AM and two FM frequencies cover the northern side of the Madison market as well as the Wisconsin Dells sub-market effectively giving Magnum's new rock format coverage of the entire Madison area.

References

External links

FAW
Classic rock radio stations in the United States
Radio stations established in 1963
1963 establishments in Wisconsin